Quesnel Airport  is located  north of Quesnel, British Columbia, Canada.

Airlines and destinations

History
The aerodrome was listed as "under construction" with one runway as follows:

See also
Quesnel Lake Airport

References

External links

 

Certified airports in British Columbia
Cariboo Regional District
Royal Canadian Air Force stations
Military airbases in British Columbia
Military history of British Columbia